The Snake War (1864–1868) was an irregular war fought by the United States of America against the "Snake Indians," the settlers' term for Northern Paiute, Bannock and Western Shoshone bands who lived along the Snake River.  Fighting took place in the states of Oregon, Nevada, and California, and in Idaho Territory. Total casualties from both sides of the conflict numbered 1,762 dead, wounded, or captured.

Background
The conflict was a result of increasing tension over several years between the Native tribes and the settlers who were encroaching on their lands, and competing for game and water. Explorers passing through had minimal effect.  In October 1851, Shoshone Indians killed eight men in Fort Hall Idaho.  From the time of the Clark Massacre, in 1851 the regional Native Americans, commonly called the "Snakes" by the white settlers, harassed and sometimes attacked emigrant parties crossing the Snake River Valley.  European-American settlers retaliated by attacking Native American villages. In September 1852, Ben Wright and a group of miners responded to an Indian attack by attacking the Modoc village near Black Bluff in Oregon, killing about 41 Modoc.  Similar attacks and retaliations took place in the years leading up to the Snake War.

In August 1854, Native attacks on several pioneer trains along the Snake River culminated in the Ward Massacre on August 20, 1854, in which Native Americans killed 21 people.  The following year, the US Army mounted the punitive Winnas Expedition.  From 1858 at the end of the Spokane-Coeur d'Alene-Paloos War, the US Army protected the migration to Oregon by sending out escorts each spring.  Natives continued to attack migrant trains, especially stragglers such as the Myers party, killed in the Salmon Falls Massacre of September 13, 1860.  As Federal troops withdrew in 1861 to return east for engagements of the American Civil War, California Volunteers provided protection to the emigrants.  Later the 1st Washington Territory Infantry Regiment and the 1st Oregon Cavalry replaced Army escorts on the emigrant trails.

As gold mining declined in California in the later 1850s, miners searching for gold started to move north and eastward into the upper Great Basin, and Snake River valley, they competed more for resources with the Native Americans.  They lived on the land longer and consumed more game and water.  Many isolated occurrences resulted in violence, with the result that both sides were taking to arms.  The influx of miners into the Nez Perce reservation during the Clearwater Gold Rush raised tensions among all the tribes.  The Nez Perce were divided when some chiefs agreed to a new treaty that permitted the intrusion.  As miners developed new locations near Boise in 1862 and in the Owyhee Canyonlands in 1863, an influx of white settlers descended on the area.  Western Shoshone, Paiute and other local Indians resisted the encroachment, fighting what was called the Snake War from 1864 to 1868.

About the war
The Snake War was not defined by one large battle but was a series of guerrilla skirmishes between the Indians and American patrols from many small camps, taking place across California, Utah, Nevada, Oregon, and Idaho.  Unlike other Indian Wars, the Snake War had few notable leaders on either side.  Probably the best-known Indian leader was Pahninee aka Chief Paulina and the most well-known U.S. Army commander of the Snake War was George Crook.  He had played a significant role for the Union in the Civil War and following his success in ending the Snake War, would lead operations in the Apache Wars.  Many of the U.S. troops fighting in the beginning of the war were volunteer regiments from the states of Oregon and California and from Washington Territory.  The regular US Army called the period of their involvement in the Snake War, the Campaign against Indians, Oregon, Idaho, and California (1865–1868).

Conclusion
The Snake War wound down after peace talks between George Crook and Snake chief Weahwewa had taken place. The Snake War has been widely forgotten in United States history.  One reason was that the Paiute and Western Shoshone did not have notable reputations as warriors, unlike the Apache.  Few reporters covered the war, and Joe Wasson was one of the first.  More significantly, much of the nation was concentrating on the American Civil War and its aftermath. Despite its being overlooked, the Snake War was statistically the deadliest of the Indian Wars in the West in terms of casualties.

By the end, a total of 1,762 men were known to have been killed, wounded, and captured on both sides. By comparison, the Battle of the Little Bighorn produced about 847 casualties.

Snake War Posts: California, Idaho, Nevada, Oregon 

 Fort Dalles, Oregon (1850–1867)
 Fort Churchill, Nevada (1860–1869)
 Camp Nye, Nevada (1861–1865)
 Fort Ruby, Nevada (1862–1869)
 Camp Smoke Creek, Nevada (1862–1864)
 Camp Dun Glen, Nevada (1863, 1865–1866)
 Fort Trinity, Eightmile, Nevada (1863–1864)
 Fort Klamath, Oregon (1863–1890)
 Fort Boise, Boise, Idaho (1863–1879)
 Camp Susan, Susanville, California (1864)
 Post at Friday's Station (1864)
 Camp Bidwell, California (1865–1879) (Later Fort Bidwell)
 Antelope Station, Nevada (1864)
 Camp Alvord, Oregon (1864–1866)
 Camp Dalgren, Oregon (1864)
 Camp Henderson, Oregon (1864–1866)
 Camp Lincoln, Oregon 1864
 Camp Maury, Oregon (1864)
 Camp Russell, Oregon (1864–1865)
 Camp Watson, Oregon (1864–1869)
 Samuel Smith's Camp, Idaho (1864), near the mouth of the Raft River.
 Quinn River Camp, Nevada (1865)
 Fort McDermitt, Nevada (1865–1889)
 Camp McGarry, Nevada (1865–1868)
 Camp McKee, Nevada (1865–1866)
 Camp Overend, Nevada (1865)
 Camp Reed, Idaho (1865–1866), near Twin Falls on old Kelton Road near its crossing of Rock Creek.
 Camp Wallace or Cantonment Soldier, Idaho (1865), located on the Big Camas Prairie near Fairfield, Idaho.
 Camp Lyon, Idaho (1865–1869), near Jordan Valley, Oregon on Jordan Creek within one mile of the Idaho state line.
 Camp Colfax, Oregon (1865–1867)
 Camp Currey, Oregon (1865–1866)
 Camp Logan, Oregon (1865–1868)
 Camp Polk, Oregon (1865–1866)
 Camp on Silvies River, Oregon (1864?)
 Camp Wright, Oregon (1865–1866)
 Camp Buford, Idaho (1866)
 Old Camp Warner, Oregon (1866–1867)
 Camp Warner, Oregon (1867–1874)
 Camp Winthrop, September 26, 1866 – April 1867
 Camp Three Forks, April, 1867 – October 23, 1871

References

Sources
 The Snake War, 1864-1868, Idaho State Historical Society Reference Series #236, 1966
 Hubert Howe Bancroft, Mrs. Frances Auretta Fuller Barrett Victor, HISTORY OF OREGON, Vol. II. 1848-1888,  The History Company, San Francisco, 1888, Chapters XX MILITARY ORGANIZATION AND OPERATIONS 1861-1865 and XXI THE SHOSHONE WARS 1866–1868, pp. 488–654
Michno, Gregory, The Deadliest Indian War in the West: The Snake Conflict, 1864-1868. Caldwell: Caxton Press, 2007.
 Wooster, Robert, The Military and United States Indian Policy 1865-1903, New Haven: Yale University Press, 1988.
 Hook, Jason, and Martin Pegler, To Live and Die in the West: The American Indian Wars,  Chicago: Fitzroy Dearborn Publishers, 2001.

 
Massacres in the United States
C
Ethnic cleansing in the United States